Ilana Karaszyk (also "Karashik"; אילנה קרשיק; born July 1, 1938) is an Israeli former Olympic runner and long jumper. In 1960 she was the Israeli Women's Champion in the 200 metre run and in the long jump.

Karaszyk was born in Poland, and is Jewish.

Running and long jump career
Her personal best was 5.39 in the long jump, in 1960. In 1960 Karaszyk was the Israeli Women's Champion in the long jump with a jump of 5.13 metres, and in the 200 metre run with a time of 26.8.

Karaszyk competed for Israel at the 1960 Summer Olympics in Rome, Italy, in Athletics at the age of 22. In the Women's Long Jump she came in 28th with a best jump of 5.08 metres. In the Women's 200 metres she came in fifth in Heat 2 with a time of 26.5. When she competed in the Olympics she was 5-4.5 (165 cm) tall and weighed 130 lbs (59 kg).

References 

Living people
Jewish female athletes (track and field)
Athletes (track and field) at the 1960 Summer Olympics
Israeli female long jumpers
1938 births
Israeli female sprinters
Olympic athletes of Israel
Polish emigrants to Israel
Polish female long jumpers
Place of birth missing (living people)